Max von Mühlenen (1903–1971) was a Swiss painter and educator.

Artist Claude Sandoz was one of his pupils.

Sources

 Max von Mühlenen 1903–1971. Retrospektive des malerischen Werkes. Kunsthalle Bern, 3. Mai–9. Jun. 1974. Kunsthalle, Bern 1974 (exhibition catalogue)
 Mark Adrian (1974): Max von Mühlenen: Mein Bern. 6 Bleistiftkompositionen von Max von Mühlenen. Published by the School Directorate of the City of Bern
 Max von Mühlenen: Aus den Aufzeichnungen des Malers (selected and edited by Max Altorfer). Benteli: Bern 1982

20th-century Swiss painters
Swiss male painters
1903 births
1971 deaths
20th-century Swiss male artists